Silent Evidence is a 1922 British silent mystery film directed by E. H. Calvert and starring David Hawthorne, Marjorie Hume and Frank Dane.

Cast
 David Hawthorne as Mark Stanton  
 Marjorie Hume as Rosamund  
 Frank Dane as Raoul de Merincourt  
 H. R. Hignett as Charles  
 Cecil del Gue as Dr. Hickson  
 Winifred Nelson as Fiancée

References

Bibliography
 Low, Rachael. History of the British Film, 1918-1929. George Allen & Unwin, 1971.

External links
 

1922 films
1922 mystery films
British mystery films
British silent feature films
British black-and-white films
Films directed by E. H. Calvert
1920s English-language films
1920s British films
Silent mystery films